Angus Edmond (born ) is a New Zealand cyclo-cross cyclist. He represented his nation in the men's elite event at the 2016 UCI Cyclo-cross World Championships in Heusden-Zolder.

References

External links
 

1976 births
Living people
Cyclo-cross cyclists
New Zealand male cyclists
Place of birth missing (living people)